Benjamin Hayes may refer to:

 Benjamin Ignatius Hayes (1815–1877), American pioneer 
 Benjamin Francis Hayes (1830–1906), Free Will Baptist pastor, author and educator
 Benjamin Hayes (politician), California state assemblyman